This is a list of companion plants. Many more are in the list of beneficial weeds. Companion plants assist in the growth of others by attracting beneficial insects, repelling pests, or providing nutrients, shade, or support. They can be part of a biological pest control program.

Vegetables

Fruit

Herbs

Flowers

Other

See also
 Push–pull agricultural pest management
 Sustainable agriculture
 Sustainable landscaping
 Sustainable gardening

References

External links
Bohnsack, U. Companion Planting Guide.
Companion plants by Professor Stuart B. Hill Department of Entomology Macdonald College
Cass County Extension Companion Planting List
Companion Planting Infographic

Further reading
Cunningham, Sally Jean. Great Garden Companions: A companion planting system for a beautiful, chemical-free vegetable garden. 1998. 
Hylton, W. The Rodale Herb Book, Eighth Printing. Rodale Press. 1974. 

+
Lists of plants
Gardening lists
Sustainable agriculture
Sustainable gardening